Patrick Street is an Irish folk group founded by Kevin Burke (formerly of The Bothy Band) on fiddle, Andy Irvine (Sweeney's Men, Planxty) on mandolin, bouzouki, harmonica and vocals, Jackie Daly (De Dannan) on button accordion, and Arty McGlynn (Van Morrison) on guitar.

Other members were added at various times: Ged Foley (The House Band, Battlefield Band) who held the tenure on guitar for many years, Bill Whelan on keyboards, Declan Masterson on uilleann pipes and keyboards, James Kelly on fiddle, Brendan Hearty on harmonium, John Carty on fiddle, flute and banjo, and Enda Walsh on keyboards.

Dónal Lunny, Whelan, and Walsh joined as producers on some albums.

History
In 1985, Andy Irvine joined up with fiddler Kevin Burke and guitarist Mícheál Ó Domhnaill (who had been gigging together around America for some time) and toured as a trio in the USA; when Ó Domhnaill wasn't available for some of the dates, guitarist/vocalist Gerry O'Beirne stepped in.

"This tour was such fun and so successful that we decided to expand the outfit into a four-piece by adding Jackie Daly", Irvine wrote.

Originally billed on a 1986 American tour as "The Legends of Irish Music", they soon chose to call themselves Patrick Street. The line-up for the band underwent several changes, but always included Burke, Irvine and Daly.

The guitar role, however, passed:
from O'Beirne to Arty McGlynn – before the recording of their first album, Patrick Street, which began in August 1986;
from McGlynn to Ged Foley – after the band recorded their fourth album, All in Good Time, released in 1993;  
back to McGlynn – when they resumed touring after the completion of their ninth album, On the Fly, released in 2007.

After Daly retired from Patrick Street, John Carty joined on fiddle, flute and tenor banjo in time to record On the Fly.

Patrick Street was originally conceived as a part-time band, nevertheless they have recorded nine studio albums and one live album.

Music for a Found Harmonium
The song was included on the Green Linnet 20th Anniversary, 2-CD collection of various artists, issued in 1996.

In 2004, Patrick Street's rendition of "Music for a Found Harmonium" (originally composed by Simon Jeffes from The Penguin Cafe Orchestra), was used near the end of the movie Napoleon Dynamite. It was also used in the 1991 film Hear My Song.

In 2008, the furniture company MFI also used Patrick Street's cover of "Music for a Found Harmonium" as the soundtrack of a TV advertisement.

In 2009, Topic Records included "Music for a Found Harmonium" from Irish Times as track fifteen on the first CD ("Disk one") of their 70-year anniversary boxed set Three Score and Ten.

Discography

Studio albums
 Patrick Street (1986)
 No. 2 Patrick Street (1988)
 Irish Times (1990)
 All in Good Time (1993)
 Cornerboys (1996)
 Made in Cork (1997)
 Street Life (2002)
 On the Fly (2007)

Live albums
 Live from Patrick Street (1999)

Compilations
 The Best of Patrick Street (1995)
 Compendium: The Best of Patrick Street (2000)

References

External links
Patrick Street 'Artist page' at Green Linnet website. Retrieved 26 March 2015.
Patrick Street at Adastra website. Retrieved 26 March 2015. 
Patrick Street at Herschel Freeman Agency website. Retrieved 26 March 2015.
Patrick Street catalogue at MusicBrainz website. Retrieved 16 March 2015.
Kevin Burke – Official website. Retrieved 26 March 2015.
Andy Irvine – Official website. Retrieved 26 March 2015.
Jackie Daly's biography at Kanturk Arts website. Retrieved 26 March 2015.

Irish folk musical groups
Musical groups from Dublin (city)
Green Linnet Records artists
Topic Records artists